SRB-A is a series of Japanese solid-fueled rocket booster manufactured by IHI Corporation for use on the H-IIA, H-IIB, and Epsilon rockets.

Design
SRB-A is 2.5 meters in diameter, and 15.1 meters in length. Its casing is a carbon-fiber-reinforced polymer filament-wound composite. Two-axis attitude control is provided by electrically-actuated thrust vectoring. 

IHI led the development and production of the SRB-A, and various companies also participated in its development and production. For example, the composite fuel is BP-208, developed and manufactured by NOF Corporation (ja), and the carbon fiber, one of the components of the motor case, is T1000GB, developed and manufactured by Toray.

On the other hand, in order to shorten the development time of the SRB-A, foreign technology was used for the molding process of the motor case. The composite motor case design is based on technology used on the Castor 120 motor by Alliant Techsystems, itself based on the first stage motor for the LGM-118 Peacekeeper MIRV-capable intercontinental ballistic missile (ICBM).

Versions

SRB-A
The original SRB-A was developed for the H-IIA rocket, and was used on its first 6 flights. It was derived from the SRB used on H-II. During the sixth launch of an H-IIA, one of the boosters failed to separate due to a leak of hot gasses eroding the detachment points, causing the rocket to fail to reach orbit.

SRB-A2
SRB-A2 was a planned upgrade, intended to replace SRB-A on H-IIA. Following the 2003 failure, it was cancelled and its design improvements were merged into the SRB-A Improved.

SRB-A Improved
An improved version of SRB-A was developed following the 2003 incident. The nozzle was changed from a conical to a bell shape, to reduce thermal loading and erosion. Its thrust was also reduced slightly, and its burn time lengthened, to further decrease heating. This version was flown on the seventh through the thirteenth H-IIA. However, the nozzle erosion problem was still not fully solved, leading to the development of the SRB-A3

SRB-A3
SRB-A3 is the current version, redesigned to provide higher performance and improve reliability. It is available in two variants, one producing high thrust at a short duration burn, and the other with a longer duration lower thrust burn. It has been used on all H-IIA flights past the thirteenth mission, as well as the H-IIB and as the first stage of Epsilon.

Successor

SRB-3
Unlike the SRB-A, the composite motor case of the SRB-3 is manufactured using Japan's own technology, without using ATK's technology.

The SRB-3 used in the H3 and Epsilon S rockets has one ton more propellant than the SRB-A series to increase its launch capability. To improve reliability and reduce cost, the separation mechanism of the SRB-3 has been greatly simplified compared to the SRB-A series, and the nozzle has been changed from a variable type to a fixed type. In the SRB-A series, the burn pattern was different when two or four boosters were used in the H-IIA/B and when used as the first stage of the Epsilon, but in the SRB-3, the burn pattern is the same when two or four boosters are used in the H3 and when the SRB-3 is used as the first stage of the Epsilon S.

References

Solid-fuel rockets
Rocket engines of Japan